Dajabón National Airport is an airport that serves Dajabón, the capital of Dajabón Province in the western Dominican Republic.

See also

Transport in Dominican Republic
List of airports in Dominican Republic

References

External links
OpenStreetMap - Dajabón Airport
SkyVector - Dajabón Airport
OurAirports - Dajabón Airport

Airports in the Dominican Republic
Buildings and structures in Dajabón Province